The 1922 Fordham Maroon football team was an American football team that represented Fordham University as an independent during the 1922 college football season. In its third, non-consecutive season under coach Frank Gargan, Fordham compiled a 3–5–2 record and outscored opponents by a total of 152 to 93.

Schedule

References

Fordham
Fordham Rams football seasons
Fordham Maroon football